Minnie is an unincorporated community in Wetzel County, West Virginia, United States.

The community most likely was named after Minnie Morgan, the daughter of an early settler.

References 

Unincorporated communities in West Virginia
Unincorporated communities in Wetzel County, West Virginia